WGNM (channel 45) is a religious television station in Macon, Georgia, United States, owned and operated by the Christian Television Network (CTN). The station's studios are located on Steven Drive in northwestern Macon, and its transmitter is located on GA 87/US 23/US 129 ALT (Golden Isles Highway), along the Twiggs–Bibb county line.

History
The station first signed on the air on November 30, 1990 as an independent station owned by the locally based Macon Urban Ministries, doing business as Good News Television. WGNM became a charter affiliate of UPN in the summer of 1996. The station was sold to the Christian Television Network in February 2004; despite this, the new owner maintained the UPN affiliation and some syndicated secular programming, along with an overnight affiliation with the Shop at Home Network, though religious programming has always made up the bulk of WGNM's broadcast schedule.

Upon the merger of UPN and The WB into The CW, announced in January 2006, CTN used the opportunity to withdraw WGNM from carrying secular programming, refusing to take either The CW or MyNetworkTV. CTN completed the withdrawal on September 2, 2006, and switched to originating a fully religious schedule.

On February 1, 2008, WGNM turned off its analog transmitter and began broadcasting exclusively in digital.

On April 24, 2020 at 12 p.m., WGNM moved from RF channel 45 to RF channel 33 and began broadcasting in 1080i high definition.

Subchannels
The station's digital signal is multiplexed:

References

External links
Official website

Television channels and stations established in 1990
GNM
1990 establishments in Georgia (U.S. state)
Christian Television Network affiliates